Charles R. Hamilton is a United States Army general who has served as the commanding general of United States Army Materiel Command since 16 March 2023. He most recently served as the deputy chief of staff for logistics of the Army Staff since 6 April 2022 to 16 March 2023. He previously served as the Assistant Deputy Chief of Staff for Logistics of the United States Army from May 2021 to March 2022, and prior to that was the Deputy Chief of Staff for Logistics and Operations of the United States Army Materiel Command from July 2020 to April 2021.

References

|-

|-

|-

|-

|-

|-

Living people
Place of birth missing (living people)
Recipients of the Defense Superior Service Medal
Recipients of the Legion of Merit
United States Army generals
Year of birth missing (living people)